Slovenské Nové Mesto (or ) is a village and municipality in the Trebišov District in the Košice Region of south-eastern Slovakia.

History
The village is a former suburb of the Hungarian city of Sátoraljaújhely, which was separated from the rest of the city by the border of the newly created Czechoslovakia in 1920. The Košice - Mukacheve railway-line made the village strategically important.

Geography
The village lies at an altitude of 104 metres and covers an area of 13.382 km².
It has a population of about 1060 people

Ethnicity
The village is about 87% Slovak and 13% Hungarian

Politics
The present mayor is Ján Kalinič.

Facilities
The village has a public library and a football pitch.

Sources

External links
 Municipal website 

Villages and municipalities in Trebišov District